is a series of educational Japanese manga books. Each volume explains a particular subject in science or mathematics. The series is published in Japan by Ohmsha, in America by No Starch Press, in France by H&K, in Italy by L'Espresso. and in Taiwan by 世茂出版社. Different volumes are written by different authors.

Volume list
The series to date of February 18, 2023 consists of 50 volumes in Japan. Fourteen of them have been published in English and six in French so far, with more planned, including one on sociology. In contrast, 49 of them have been published and translated in Chinese.

The Manga Guide to Electricity 
This 207-page guide consists of five chapters, excluding the preface, prologue, and epilogue. It explains fundamental concepts in the study of electricity, including Ohm's law and Fleming's rules. There are written explanations after each manga chapter. An index and two pages to write notes on are provided.

The story begins with Rereko, an average high-school student who lives in Electopia (the land of electricity), failing her final electricity exam. She was forced to skip her summer vacation and go to Earth for summer school. The high school teacher Teteka sensei gave her a “transdimensional walkie-talkie and observation robot” named Yonosuke, which she will use later for going back and forth to Earth. Rereko then met her mentor Hikaru sensei, who did Electrical Engineering Research at a university in Tokyo, Japan. Hikaru sensei explained to Rereko the basic components of electricity with occasional humorous moments.

In the fifth chapter, Hikaru sensei told Rereko her studies are over. Yonosuke soon received Electopia’s call to pick Rereko up. Hikaru sensei told her that he learned a lot from teaching her, and she should keep at it, even back on Electopia. Rereko told Hikaru sensei to keep working on his research and clean his room often. Her sentence was interrupted, and she was transported back to her hometown.

A year later, Hikaru sensei was waiting at the university bus stop. Suddenly, lightning struck his laboratory. He ran to it and found Rereko waiting inside. Rereko told him she graduated, and Teteka sensei assigned her to work at the university as a research assistant, which makes Hikaru sensei and Rereko lab partners.

The Manga Guide to Physics
This 232-page book covers the physics of common objects. It consists of 4 chapters, excluding the preface, prologue, epilogue, appendix, and index. The artist is Keita Takatsu, and the scenario writer is re_akino. The plot revolves around Megumi Ninomiya, an athletic girl, and Ryota Nonomura, a physics Olympics silver medalist.

Megumi was bothered by physics. On the test, she circled an incorrect answer on a question involving Newton's Third Law. The question bothered her during her tennis match with her competitor Sayaka, causing her to be unable to concentrate.

When Megumi was cleaning up after the match, she was suddenly hit by a tennis ball. Ryota meant to help throw the ball into the basket, but he was uncoordinated. Megumi told him about her concern about the test question, and asked him to help her understand physics, and he agreed.

After many lectures about Momentum, Newton's Third Law, and other physics concepts, Megumi is ready for a rematch with Sayaka. This time, Megumi won. Sayaka asked Megumi if she could be her partner for the next doubles match, and she agreed.

The Manga Guide to Molecular Biology 
Ami and Rin did not attend enough lessons to pass biology, causing them to have to attend summer school. They were instructed to visit their professor, Dr. Moro's island. There, they met Dr. Moro's assistant Marcus, who taught them lessons on the fundamentals of molecular biology with the dream machine.

After their studies ended, Ami and Rin found out that Dr. Moro had an incurable disease. The professor intended to use a hibernation machine to wait until new technologies were developed. Ami and Rin decided to be doctors and try to cure the disease. Numerous years later, Dr. Moro was cured, and he, Marcus, Ami, and Rin were shown having a toast together.

References

External links 
 No Starch Press official website
 Ohmsha official website

Romantic comedy anime and manga
Series of books
Non-fiction comics
Series of mathematics books
No Starch Press books